Diego de Loaysa, CRSA was a prelate of the Roman Catholic Church. He served as bishop of the Roman Catholic Diocese of Modruš, Croatia, from 1538 until 1549. 

He was known for consecrating the famous Dominican friar, social reformer and bishop Bartolomé de las Casas.

Episcopal lineage 
 Cardinal Willem van Enckevoirt
 Bishop Bernardino de Soria
 Bishop Diego de Loaysa, CRSA

References 

16th-century Roman Catholic bishops in Croatia